Fluvioglacial landforms are those that result from the associated erosion and deposition of sediments caused by glacial meltwater. These landforms may also be referred to as glaciofluvial in nature. Glaciers contain suspended sediment loads, much of which is initially picked up from the underlying landmass. Landforms are shaped by glacial erosion through processes such as glacial quarrying, abrasion, and meltwater. Glacial meltwater contributes to the erosion of bedrock through both mechanical and chemical processes.

Meltwater streams and formed by glaciers, especially in warmer seasons. Supra-glacial streams, those above the glacial surface, and subglacial streams, those beneath the glacial surface. At the interface of the glacier and the underlying land surface, the immense weight of the glacier causes ice to melt and produces subglacial meltwater streams. These streams under immense pressure and at high velocities along with the overlying weight of the glacier itself are able to carve into landscapes and pluck sediment from the ground. This sediment is transported as the glacier advances. In warmer seasons, the glacier diminishes and retreats. This process leaves behind dropped sediment in the form of depositional landforms. The two processes of advancement and retreat have the power to transform a landscape and leave behind a series of landforms that give great insight into past glacial presence and behavior. Landforms that result from these processes include moraines, kames, kettles, eskers, drumlins, plains, and proglacial lakes.

Moraine 
Moraines consist of sediments deposited by a glacier and subsequent glacial meltwater also known as glacial till. Moraines are commonly found near the extremities of a glacier, the bounds between two glacial bodies, or underneath a glacial body. Moraines may be used to mark the extent of a glaciated region and the successive patterns of advance and retreat during glaciation. The name and specific characteristics of a moraine are dependent upon its location relative to the glacial body and the processes that deposited the relevant glacial till. Four overarching types of moraines include lateral, medial, ground, and end. 

The size of the deposited sediments which form a moraine can range from clay to boulder sized. Moraines can be reworked by further glacial action or meltwater into other fluvioglacial landforms. Both original and reworked moraines record a continuum of processes occurring on the landscape as a result of glacial presence.

Lateral moraine 

Lateral moraines are ridges of sediment deposited alongside the glacier running parallel to the long axis of the glacier. These sediments are typically deposited on top of the ice (supraglacial till) at the margin of the glacier and as such do not experience the same amount of glacial erosion as other incorporated sediments., Sediments that form the lateral moraines can be the result of frost weathering of the valley wall as the glacier passes through a region or sediment deposition by streams flowing into the glacial valley. These sediments settle into a ridge as the glacier retreats.

Medial moraine 
Medial moraines are often thought to be the result of two glaciers converging. The sediment located between both glaciers is pushed on top of the larger conjoined glacier as the two bodies come together. Medial moraines may also form as subglacial and englacial material is carried upward by ice flow and collects at the surface and inside the glacial body. This till is then carried along in the direction of glacial advance. As the glacier melts, the sediment is deposited as a ridge in the middle of the glacial valley.

Ground moraine 
Ground moraines are regions of glacial till that form relatively flat areas or gently rolling hills. Commonly ground moraines are composed of lodgment till. Sediment clasts suspended in the ice at the bottom of the glacier have greater friction with the ground than the ice does. This causes the sediment to be slowed down disproportionately to the ice and eventually fall out or get stuck in the ground beneath the ice. The till may also be deposited as the glacier melts and retreats. Ground moraines are sometimes referred to as till plains. Ground moraines and loose till can be shaped into drumlins as the overlying glacier advances or retreats.

End moraine 

Terminal moraines indicate the furthest advance of a glacier. As the glacier advances, sediment is transported to the bottom of the glacier and deposited. When the glacier melts, this unconsolidated debris forms ridges. The shape of a terminal represents the shape of the glacier snout or terminus. Terminal moraine refers to the moraine occurring at the point of the furthest advance of a glacier. A recessional moraine is a ridge of deposited debris that occurs when the glacier is stationary for an extended length of time. This occurs when a glacier meaning the glacier is in equilibrium or has halted during retreat . The occurrence of end moraines can be useful for determining a pattern of advance, retreat, and equilibrium of a glacier.

Kames 
A kame is an irregularly shaped hill or mound formed by sediment deposition of a retreating glacier. The sediments are held in a depression in the glacier and are subsequently deposited as the glacier melts. Glacial meltwater causes further erosion and the characteristically unusual shape of these landforms that distinguishes them from drumlins. Sediment grains located in a kame can range from fine to course-grained and cobble size to boulder-sized Kames are frequently associated with kettles in regions referred to as “kame and kettle topography”.

Kame terrace 
Kame terraces form when a glacial margin rests against a valley wall. The valley wall prevents meltwater streams from flowing outward away from the glacial snout. Instead, glacial meltwater is diverted laterally along the ice margin and deposits sediments between the glacier and valley wall. As the glacier retreats, the process may repeat creating a stepped slope or terrace referred to as a kame terrace. In a singular form, this landform may also be referred to as a kame moraine. Exact kame terrace morphology is dependent on the flow of the formative meltwater stream, and the angle between the ice margin and valley wall. Kame terraces are useful tool to indicate past ice margins.

Kame delta 
A kame delta is a flat-topped landform of well sorted sand and gravel glaciofluvial sediments deposited by a meltwater stream into a body of water or river system. As such, kame deltas may be used to indicate a point of inflow into a body of water, such as a proglacial lake, even after that water has ceased to be present in a landscape. Sediment heavy meltwater streams running out of or off of a glacial body will slow in velocity once in contact with a body of water. This decrease in velocity causes the streams to be unable to carry sediment and the sediment falls out of the water column. Heavier sediments will fall out of the water column first as the water velocity decreases.  As such, layered bedding of sediment size is expected in kame deltas.

Kettle 
Kettles are impressions left in a glacial outwash plain by remnant ice of a retreating glacier. As a glacier retreats, chunks of ice may break off in a process known as ice calving or glacier calving. As sediment-heavy glacial meltwater flows past the stationary ice block, the increased friction between the ice and sediment causes sediment build-up around the block of ice. The sediment may become so extensive as to completely bury the ice piece. The ice then melts and leaves behind an impression in the ground.

The remaining hole is referred to as a kettle. The exact size and characteristics of the kettle whole are a result of the degree of ice burial. Often these holes become filled with water by meltwater streams and are referred to as kettle lakes. Kettle lakes are often shallow due to the amount of sediment carried into them by glacial meltwater.

Eskers 
Eskers are long, curving ridges of stratified sediments found in previously glaciated regions. They may be several meters to hundreds of kilometers in length. The height and width of an esker are determined by the water and ice pressure and sediment load at the time of formation. Eskers form in ice tunnels within or under a glacier, as shown in Figure 1, and are composed of the sediment deposits from the streams that occupy these tunnels. Eskers may also form from supra-glacial streams that cut into the crevasses of the glacier. After the ice has melted away the stream deposits are left remaining as long mounded eskers. A system of subglacial streams may create a branched formation of eskers, although these are not often continuous branches.  

Often eskers follow the flow direction of the glacier, but in high-pressure cases meltwater is pushed to the lowest available spot which can form a very shallow and wide subglacial stream, resulting in short and wide eskers. Under less pressure, often near the terminal end of a glacier, where the ice moves rather slowly, steeped walled eskers may form. The debris found in eskers is dependent on the sediment in the ice and the supply to the meltwater stream within the tunnel. This sediment is usually sand to cobble-sized, with the occasional larger boulder. Bedding, although irregular at times, is expected in eskers.

Drumlins 
A drumlin is an elongated hill shaped like a half-buried egg, where the shallower end of the hill also narrows in width. A collection of drumlins in one area is referred to as a field or swarm and creates a landscape sometimes called a “basket of eggs topography”. The shape of a drumlin may vary but most often is oval in nature with a long axis parallel to the direction of ice flow. The steeper slope is typically up-ice whereas the shallower slow is down-ice. It is proposed that the width to length ratio of a drumlin can be used to determine the velocity at which a glacier was traveling. An elongated drumlin indicates a slower glacial velocity, whereas a shortened drumlin indicates a much faster glacial velocity. This is surmised due to the relationship between friction and surface area.

Drumlins form as overlying ice moves across unconsolidated till or ground moraines. There are two main theories for the formation of drumlins. Although the exact origins of these landforms may vary circumstantially and is a topic of debate. The first, often called constructional, suggests that glacial till is deposited by meltwater streams and accumulated by the continual push of an overlying glacier. By this process the individual till particles in the drumlin align themselves in the direction of ice flow. Scientists can test this theory by studying the orientation of the sediment grains with the overall orientation of the drumlin. The second theory is that the erosion caused by the heavy overlying glacier scrapes material from an unconsolidated sediment bed and repositions it and deposits it at the drumlin. The drumlin is similarly shaped by the flow of ice as in the previously mentioned theory. The distinction being where the glacial till is derived from before being shaped. In all circumstances, because the subglacial region is not visible until after the glacier has retreated and because there is great variability in drumlin presentation, there remains some uncertainty as to the processes that shape these landforms.  

Drumlins may be composed of stratified or unstratified till ranging in size from sand to boulders. The non-uniformity of drumlin composition is representative of the diverse origin of the sediments. Banding or layering of till may occur in drumlins as till accumulates on the drumlin formation in successive layers.

Plains

Outwash plain 
An outwash plain is a relatively flat region at the terminus of a glacier where glacial sediments are deposited by meltwater outwash. The sediment is distally sorted, the larger sediment being deposited closer to the margin of the glacier and finer-grained sediment carried further along by the meltwater streams. Outwash plains may contain other glaciofluvial landforms including meltwater streams, kames, and kettle lakes. River systems in outwash plains typically form braided rivers due to the high sediment content in the water.

Till plains 
Till plains are regions of flat to gently sloping topography, composed of till deposited by a melting glacier. Till plains may also be referred to as a region of ground moraines. Different from outwash plains, till plains form when a section of ice breaks off from the main glacier. The sediment contained in this ice is deposited as a till plain when the ice melts. The till is further dispersed and molded by the resulting meltwater. The composition of a till plain varies greatly and is dependent upon the path the glacier took and the bedrock underlying the glaciated region. Till plains are composed of poorly sorted sediment ranging in size from sand to large boulders. Landforms contained in a till plain include drumlins and moraines which are composed of glacial till.

Proglacial lake 
A proglacial lake is an impoundment of water prevented from flowing by a glacier or glacial till dam. Proglacial lakes are usually the byproduct of glacial meltwater. The sediment contained in a proglacial lake is a useful geochronological tool that records patterns of change in a glaciated region.  Proglacial lakes may be dammed by a moraine, glacial ice, or may be trapped at the snout of a glacier by the isostatic depression of the crust by the glacier., A tarn is a specific term for a proglacial lake that forms in the over-deepened bowl of a cirque.

Notes

See also
Ice sheet
Glacier
Landform
Fluvial
Glaciofluvial
Glacial Landform
Meltwater
Glacial Erosion
Earth sciences
Glaciology